Georgian Mall is the largest mall in Barrie, Ontario, Canada. Anchor stores are Hudson's Bay and HomeSense.

History
Georgian Mall originally opened in 1968 with Sears as its only department store and Dominion as a supermarket. Next door in a separate development was a free-standing K-mart department store. The first major expansion added a single floor Eaton's as anchor to a new two-level mall addition. (when Eaton's went bankrupt this space was divided into Sport Chek and Home Sense.) The next addition connected the mall to the K-mart building. When K-mart was bought by Hudson’s Bay Company, this space was converted to The Bay. Another former anchor was Sears, which was closed in January 2018 with the liquidation of Sears' Canadian operations.

References

External links
 Georgian Mall Official Site
 Rio-Can to Purchase mall

Buildings and structures in Barrie
Shopping malls in Ontario
Cadillac Fairview